5 Star Wrestling (stylised as 5★ Wrestling) was a professional wrestling promotion based in Scotland. The company operated from 2015-2018 and promoted events throughout Great Britain and Ireland. They also produced a television series which was broadcast on FreeView television for the FreeSports channel. The company was established to focus on promoting live professional wrestling events, after sister company Serious Parody released the 5 Star Wrestling game for PlayStation 3.

Overview
5 Star Wrestling's first event in September 2015 was similarly titled to that of their later video game 5 Star Wrestling: ReGenesis and saw John Morrison defeat Ricochet in a two out of three falls match in the main event. Morrison would then win the 5 Star Wrestling Championship defeating AJ Styles in Newcastle, and defending against Carlito, P. J. Black and retaining in a one-night 8-man tournament in the same month. The one-night 8-man tournament would be featured on Channel 5, under the name Dominant Wrestling: Live from Dundee.

After these events, 5 Star announced they would hold a 128-man tournament throughout 2017, and offered CM Punk $1 million (£770,000) to appear in the tournament, which he refused. The tournament would later be postponed until February 2018. Television channel FreeSports would pull out of a deal with Preston City Wrestling, to work with 5 Star to promote shows in 2018. In January 2018, 5 Star Wrestling held a press conference in Sheffield, promoting new shows through 2018. On 1 February 2018, 5 Star's debut on FreeSports, a new championship was established known as the "Tap Or Snap Title", which was won by Mark Haskins, winning a five-man elimination match for the championship. The event would also see Hager defeat Ryan, and John Morrison retain the 5* Championship over Rob Van Dam. A tag team title championship tournament was also established on this show, and later won by former Love Island contestant Adam Maxted, and partner Charlie Sterling.

On 20 March 2018, 5 Star would announce on Twitter that they were to cancel upcoming shows; owing to the folding of their parent company "Pro Wrestling UK Ltd".

Other media

Video Games
Originally announced in 2013, 5 Star Wrestling was released for PlayStation 3 in 2015, developed and published by sister company Serious Parody. An updated version called 5 Star Wrestling: ReGenesis was released on PlayStation 4 20 January 2016, exclusively on PlayStation Network. The game featured parodied versions of famous wrestlers, such as "HarVee Dee", as RVD.

The game cites having "true ring psychology", "Heel and Face mechanics, a revolutionary Limb Damage System and Rivalries that impact gameplay." The game features a 40-hour Challenge campaign with 128 challenges, over 400 objectives, and "more moves-per-wrestler than any other game." The game also features a unique "finisher-to-finisher" reversal system, which allows finishers to be countered immediately into a finisher for the opponent under certain circumstances.

As well as featuring parodies on many wrestlers, the game also featured many parodies of music, arenas and tropes of professional wrestling games.

Reception

The original 5 Star Wrestling game received mixed reception from critics. APG Nation gave the game 8/10 stating that "The damage system deserves praise on so many levels."  Push Square gave the game 3/10, refuting the game by saying "As it stands, without any online functionality, no creation suite, a litigious gaggle of performers, and dodgy mechanics, this game is all but impossible to recommend to anyone." The Official PlayStation magazine was even harsher, giving the game only 20%. PlayStation Universe were less harsh, however, rating the game 60% saying "5 Star Wrestling delivers a clever and refreshing take on the genre in the ring, but is massively hampered by its mountain of drawbacks and flaws outside of it. Fight your way through that and there's a satisfying depiction of how wrestling works waiting to be discovered."

The improved version 5 Star Wrestling: ReGenesis, received better critical response. Bonus Stage reviewed the PS4 game and gave the game 7/10, saying: "despite issues... 5 Star Wrestling remains very difficult to dislike". however, they acknowledge the amount of bugs citing "despite some obvious visual improvements and ironing out of many of its forebear's more prominent bugs, 5 Star Wrestling is still an inherently ugly video game."

Championships

5 Star Wrestling Championship

5 Star Tap or Snap Championship

5 Star Tag Team Championship

Real Wrestling Championship

See also
 Professional wrestling
 List of professional wrestling promotions in Great Britain and Ireland

References

External links 
 5 Star Wrestling Twitter
 Official Website
 5 Star Wrestling Facebook

British professional wrestling promotions
2015 establishments in the United Kingdom
2018 disestablishments in the United Kingdom
Professional wrestling games
Entertainment companies established in 2015
Entertainment companies disestablished in 2018
Recurring sporting events established in 2015
Recurring sporting events disestablished in 2018